Roda may refer to:

Places
Stadtroda (called Roda until 1925), a town in Thuringia, Germany
Roda, Greece, a village in Corfu, Greece
Roda, Punjab, a town and Union Council of Punjab, Pakistan
Roda, Portugal, a village in Viseu district, Portugal
Roda de Berà, a municipality in Catalonia, Spain
Roda de Eresma, a municipality in Castile and León, Spain
Roda de Isábena, a town in Aragon, Spain
Roda de Ter, a municipality in Catalonia, Spain
La Roda, a small city in Castile-La Mancha, Spain
Roda, Virginia, an unincorporated community in Wise County, Virginia, USA
Roda Group of Temples in Gujarat, India
Roda Island, an island in Cairo, Egypt

People
Roda (name)

Sports
Roda '46, a football club in Leusden, Netherlands 
Roda JC, a football club in Kerkrade, Netherlands
FC Roda Moscow, a football club in Moscow, Russia

Other uses
Roda (formation), an Afro-Brazilian form of dancing events
Roda (megamarkets), a retail chain in Serbia
Roda (river), a river in Thuringia, Germany
RodA, a protein
Códice de Roda, a collection of ancient and medieval manuscripts from Roda de Isábena